Danish Contemporary Bible 2020 is a Bible translation into Danish which attracted controversy for its nonliteral translations and omitting some references to Israel. In particular, it changed references in The New Testament to "Israel" to "the Jewish people" where the latter was meant, ostensibly because most secular readers understand "Israel" as referring to the land of Israel and not the people of Israel. Other references to Jewish people are changed to refer to all of mankind. However, direct references to the land of Israel and its kings were preserved in the translation. And “Israel” and “Israelites” are mentioned more than 2000 times in the Danish Contemporary Bible 2020. Philologos wrote that the bible translation rejects replacement theology. And the Danish Israel Mission concludes that "... this translation does not promote or express replacement theology, or antisemitic or anti-Israel sentiment. Quite the opposite, in fact."

The bible's language was also modernized in other areas to accommodate younger, secular readers who are not familiar with the bible, or with theological or agricultural terminology.

References

External links
Official website 

Bible versions and translations
2020 books